Wind power in Kentucky has limited potential for development within the state since there are generally low wind speeds, though there are specific locations where it can be effective. The state has not passed renewable portfolio standard legislation and there are no commercial-scale wind turbines. Kentucky may benefit from the development of wind power in Tennessee, an adjoining state with which it is collaborating, and from efforts by the Tennessee Valley Authority to both develop and import wind-generated electricity into the region.

Kentucky New Energy Ventures
Established in 2008, the Kentucky New Energy Ventures was a state program to incentivize the development and commercialization of alternative fuel and renewable energy products, processes, and services. The program concluded in 2017 and has not been renewed by State. The funds could have been used to stimulate private investment in Kentucky-based technology companies with high growth potential. KNEV made seed capital grants of $30,000 and investments ranging from $250,000 to $750,000+.

Mason County
In 2012 Mason County passed an ordinance which would prohibit the construction of large-scale wind farms., except in previously-designated industrial zones, but would permit mid to small scale turbines for use at a principal site, but not for sending the energy across electric transmission lines. Efforts by Duke Energy and NextEra Energy to develop a wind farm at Mays Lick were discontinued.

Tennessee Valley Authority
The Tennessee Valley Authority service area covers most of Tennessee, portions of Alabama, Mississippi, and Kentucky, and small sections of Georgia, North Carolina, and Virginia. As of 2013, the agency, in addition to the Buffalo Mountain Windfarm, had purchased agreements from power generated from wind farms outside its service area:
2012 - Enel Green Power, LLC - 201MW - Caney River Wind Farm, Elk County, Kansas.
2012- Invenergy - 200MW - Bishop Hill Wind Energy Center, Henry County, Illinois
2012- Invenergy - 200MW - California Ridge Wind Energy Center in Champaign County, Illinois  
2012- NextEra Energy Resources - 150MW - White Oak Energy Center, McLean County, Illinois 
2012- NextEra Energy Resources- 165MW - Cimarron Wind farm, Gray County, Kansas 
 
A 2010 agreement with Iberdrola Renewables provides a potential 300MW future supply from Streator-Cayuga Ridge Wind Farm, Livingston County, Illinois

Clean Line Energy LLC is proposing 700-mile power transmission line to bring wind energy from Oklahoma and to the Tennessee Valley. The TVA would import 1,750 megawatts, about half of the power that could be transmitted. Developers begun in 2007 to seek regulatory approval for the $2 billion project, but it's expected to take at least 2020 to acquire it before construction can begin.

See also

Solar power in Kentucky
Wind power in the United States
Renewable energy in the United States

References

External links

A Guide to Small Wind for Tenn and Ky
Wind Action Kentucky